is a Japanese athlete who specializes in the 400  metres run. He competed in the mixed 4 × 400 metres relay event at the 2019 World Athletics Championships.

Kota Wakabayashi gained his first international experience at the Asian Athletics Championships in Doha in 2019, where he won the gold medal with the Japanese 4 x 400 metre relay in 3:02.94 min and the bronze medal with the mixed relay in 3:20.29 min behind the teams from Bahrain and India.

References

External links

1997 births
Living people
Japanese male sprinters
Place of birth missing (living people)
World Athletics Championships athletes for Japan